HC Sporta Hlohovec is a Slovakian handball team located in Hlohovec. Their home matches are played at the Sportová Hala Na Zábraní. They compete in Extraliga.

Crest, colours, supporters

Kits

Club names 
 1951 – 1999 : TJ Odeva Hlohovec
 1963 – 1993 : TJ Drôtovňa Hlohovec
 1999 – 2011 : MŠK Hlohovec
 since 2011 : HC SPORTA Hlohovec

Accomplishments

Extraliga: 
Runners Up (1) : 2010, 2012, 2013

European record

Team

Current squad 

Squad for the 2016–17 season

Goalkeepers
 Juraj Kastak
 Michal Martin Konecny 

Wingers
RW
  Matej Takac 
  Igor Vanko
LW 
  Martin Briatka
  Lukas Pechy
  Frantisek Zatko
Line players 
  Tomas Laho
  Gabriel Papp

Back players
LB
  Luka Dacevic 
  Marian Hajko
  Lukas Rakus
CB 
  Lukas Majbik
  Tomas Tschur 
RB
  Igor Chiseliov
  Lukas Hirtl
  Matus Hrinak

External links

Slovak handball clubs
Hlohovec District
Sport in Trnava Region